Elvis Sekyanzi, also known as Elvis Sekyanzi Wavamunno, is a businessman, entrepreneur and qualified sound engineer in Uganda. He was reported in 2012 to be one of the wealthiest people in that country.

Background and education
He was born in Uganda . His father is Ugandan millionaire and entrepreneur Gordon Wavamunno. Sekyanzi studied sound engineering at the London School of Electronics.

Businesses and investments
Sekyanzi owns a number of entertainment-related businesses. He is also a director and manager in some of his father's companies, including WBS Television, Wavah Water, and Radio Simba. The businesses that he owns include Club Silk, a night club in the Bugoloobi suburb of Kampala, and Silk Events, an entertainment management company with branches in Uganda and neighboring Rwanda. He is reported to also own a Club Silk in London, United Kingdom.

Net worth
According to the New Vision newspaper, Sekyanzi had a net worth of about 8 million in 2012.

See also
 List of wealthiest people in Uganda

References

External links
 Club Silk Owner Sekyanzi Seeks Buyers

Living people
1975 births
People from Kampala District
Ugandan businesspeople
Ugandan engineers